KCWC may refer to:

 KCWC-DT, a television station (channel 8) licensed to serve Lander, Wyoming, United States
 KCWC-FM, a radio station (88.1 FM) licensed to serve Riverton, Wyoming